Costapex exbodi is a species of sea snail, a marine gastropod mollusk, in the family Costellariidae, the ribbed miters.

Description
The length of the shell attains 22.5 mm;

Distribution
This marine species occurs in New Caledonia.

References

Costellariidae